Çukurkonak  (formerly Uluhtu) is a village in Gülnar district of Mersin Province, Turkey. The village is situated in the Taurus Mountains. The population of the village was 230 as of 2012.

References

Villages in Gülnar District